Myddelton is a surname. Notable people with the surname include:

Sir Richard Myddelton, 3rd Baronet (1655–1716), Welsh politician who sat in the House of Commons from 1685 to 1705
Sir Thomas Myddelton, 1st Baronet (1624–1663), Welsh politician who sat in the House of Commons variously between 1646 and 1663
Sir Thomas Myddelton, 2nd Baronet (1651–1684), Welsh politician who sat in the House of Commons between 1679 and 1681
Robert Myddelton Biddulph (1761–1814), later Myddelton Biddulph (1761–1814), British Member of Parliament
Robert Myddelton Biddulph (1805–1872) (1805–1872), British landowner and Member of Parliament for the Liberal Party
Thomas Myddelton Biddulph (1809–1878), officer in the British Army and courtier
Sir Humfrey Myddelton Gale KBE, CB, CVO, MC (1890–1971), officer in the British Army who served in the First and Second World War
Hugh Myddelton, 1st Baronet (1560–1631), Welsh clothmaker, entrepreneur, mine-owner, goldsmith, banker and self-taught engineer
Ririd Myddelton, MVO DL JP (1902–1988), country gentleman and one-time member of the Royal Household of the Sovereign of the United Kingdom
Steve Myddelton (born 1986), professional Canadian football offensive lineman
Thomas Myddelton (Lord Mayor of London) (1550–1631), the fourth son of Richard Myddelton, Governor of Denbigh, and Jane Dryhurst
Thomas Myddelton (younger) (1586–1666), Welsh politician and Parliamentary general

See also
Myddelton baronets, of Chirke in the County of Denbigh, was a title in the Baronetage of England